The 2014 Pradhana Vizha is a television award ceremony held in Singapore by Vasantham TV. The 14th edition of Vasantham's prestigious Awards extravaganza, Pradhana Vizha saw a total of 27 awards being given out to the best in the local Indian television industry in Singapore. The Lifetime Achievement Award were awarded to Manimaran Thorasamy.

The award show were telecast live by Vasantham MediaCorp and Oli 96.8FM .The event was hosted by Udaya Soundari, Saravanan Ayyavoo and Jaynesh Isuran

Nominees and Winner
Below are the nominees and winner of 2014 Pradhana Vizha based on the category.

Performance Category

Acting Category

Hosting Category

Programme Category

Technical Category

Favorite awards

References

Tamil-language television awards
Singaporean television awards
Mediacorp